Living Among Us is a 2018 American vampire horror film, overseen by Brian Metcalf. Filmed in 2013, it was released in 2018, 7 months after the death of John Heard (who played as Andrew), making it his last feature film release.

The film was distributed by Vision Films and Sony Pictures Home Entertainment, with a limited theatrical release. On January 31, 2018, the Academy of Motion Picture Arts and Sciences requested that writer/director/producer Brian Metcalf allow the script, marking Heard's last work, to be added to their Permanent Core Collection inside the Margaret Herrick Library.

Summary
After vampires make themselves public, a group of documentarians are granted access to learn how they live and coexist with humans. But as reality sets in, the crew realize their lives are in danger.

Cast
 Esmé Bianco as Elleanor
 Thomas Ian Nicholas as Mike
 Andrew Keegan as Blake
 William Sadler as Samuel
 John Heard as Andrew
 Jordan Hinson as Carrie
 James Russo as Aaron
 Jessica Morris as Sybil
 Travis Aaron Wade as Rick
 Chad Todhunter as Selvin
 Hunter Gomez as Benny
 Anna Sophia Berglund as Journey
 Brian Metcalf as Paul
 Chris Kos as News Anchor
 Bobby Block as Dave
 Amanda Rau as Rebecca

Reviews
The film received mixed reviews. The Los Angeles Times felt that it was a “regrettable” finale to John Heard's career, stating that the only reason to bother watching the film is to see Heard's last work.

References

External links
 

2018 films
2018 horror films
Films set in the 21st century
Found footage films
American vampire films
2010s English-language films
2010s American films